Külaflı is a suburb of Karaköprü district that located in Şanlıurfa Province of Turkey.

Geography 
The distance to the city center of Sanliurfa is 33 km from the suburb.

Climate 
The climate in the suburb is mainly Continental climate, because there are significant annual temperature variations. It has hot summers and cold winters.

Demography 
The number of people by year.

Infrastructure 
There are a primary school, healthcare center and a water network system in the suburb.

References 

Şanlıurfa
Populated places in Şanlıurfa Province